Vellodius etisoides is a species of crab in the family Xanthidae. It was originally described as Pilodius etisoides, but was transferred to the monotypic genus Vellodius in 1998. It is found around Amami Ōshima in the Ryūkyū Islands, and the Paracel Islands in the South China Sea.

References

Xanthoidea
Monotypic arthropod genera